Zeune is a surname. Notable people with the surname include:

August Zeune (1778–1853), German educator
Johann Karl Zeune (1736–1788), German academic and philologist

See also
 Zeuner